Miss Venezuela 1999 was the 46th Miss Venezuela pageant, was held in Caracas, Venezuela, on September 10, 1999, after weeks of events.  The winner of the pageant was Martina Thorogood, Miss Miranda.

The pageant was broadcast live on Venevision from the Poliedro de Caracas in Caracas, Venezuela. At the conclusion of the final night of competition, outgoing titleholder Carolina Indriago crowned Martina Thorogood of Miranda as the new Miss Venezuela.

Results

Special awards
 Miss Internet (voted by www.missvenezuela.com viewers) - Martina Thorogood (Miranda)
 Miss Figure - Claudia Moreno (Distrito Federal)
 Best Smile - Norkys Batista (Nueva Esparta)
 Miss Elegance - Rocío Alvarez (Cojedes)
 Best Skin - Maria Luisa Flores (Apure)
 Best Legs - Andreína Llamozas (Vargas)
 Miss Integral - Martina Thorogood (Miranda)
 Best Hair - Antonella Baricelli (Carabobo)

Delegates
The Miss Venezuela 1999 delegates are:

Notes
Martina Thorogood placed as 1st runner-up in Miss World 1999 in London, United Kingdom.
Claudia Moreno placed as 1st runner up in Miss Universe 2000 in Nicosia, Cyprus.
Both Martina Thorogood & Claudia Moreno where runners-up to Indian delegates. Yukta Mookhey who happened to win Miss World 1999 & Lara Dutta won Miss Universe 2000
Andreína Llamozas placed as semifinalist in Miss International 1999 in Tokyo, Japan.
Norkys Batista won Miss Atlántico Internacional 2000 in Punta del Este, Uruguay. She also placed as semifinalist in Reinado Internacional del Café 2000 in Manizales, Colombia.
María Laura Lugo placed as 2nd runner up in Reina Sudamericana 1999 in Santa Cruz, Bolivia.
María Fernanda León placed as finalist in Miss Teen International 2001 in Willemstad, Curaçao.
 For the first time since 1955, the official Miss Venezuela competed at Miss World. Martina Thorogood was named 1st runner-up. Due to her runner-up status, Thorogood had a contract with the Miss World organization, therefore she could not compete in Miss Universe 2000, as previously planned. Organizers staged a small pageant called "Miss Republica Bolivariana de Venezuela" to select a delegate to Miss Universe.
 Claudia Moreno (Distrito Federal) and Maria Laura Lugo (Costa Oriental) competed in Miss Republica Bolivariana de Venezuela. Moreno won the crown, while Lugo was the 1st runner-up.
 Both Norkys Batista (Nueva Esparta) and Marjorie de Sousa (Dependencias Federales) became very successful actresses.
 Maria Fernanda Leon (Guarico) competed again in 2002 as Miss Portuguesa.

References

External links
Miss Venezuela official website

1999 beauty pageants
1999 in Venezuela